Harvey Hodder (1943 – 17 September 2020) was a  Canadian politician in Newfoundland and Labrador. Hodder was the Progressive Conservative Member of the House of Assembly (MHA) for the riding of Waterford Valley (later renamed Mount Pearl North) from 1993 to 2007.

Hodder was educated at Memorial University. He served on the municipal council for Mount Pearl and was elected mayor four times. Hodder served twelve years on the St. John's Metropolitan Area Board. From 2003 to 2007, he was the Speaker of the Newfoundland and Labrador House of Assembly. He died in Creston South.

References 

2020 deaths
1943 births
Progressive Conservative Party of Newfoundland and Labrador MHAs
Mayors of Mount Pearl
21st-century Canadian politicians
Memorial University of Newfoundland alumni
Newfoundland and Labrador municipal councillors